Cosmic Odyssey is an American science fiction comic mini-series, first published in 1988 by DC Comics. A four-issue limited series written by Jim Starlin, penciled by  Mike Mignola and lettered by John Workman, it tells a story spanning the DC Universe involving a wide variety of major characters including Superman, Batman, and the New Gods.

The series comprised four 48-page prestige format comic books.

Plot summary

Book One: Discovery
In Book One: Discovery,  Darkseid finds a comatose  Metron and takes him captive. After going over Metron’s data, Darkseid makes a startling discovery. There is something out there more powerful than him and he needs help to conquer it. Darkseid goes to Highfather. An ambassador, Lonar, arrives on Earth and asks the President of the United States to help him contact Superman, Batman, Martian Manhunter, Starfire, Etrigan, Green Lantern and "lastly, an old man with the unusual name of Mr. Blood". Lonar takes them to New Genesis via Boom Tube, to meet Highfather. After they arrive, Orion and  Lightray explain that New Genesis and Apokolips have formed an alliance. Highfather then informs the group about the origin of the Anti-Life Equation, New Genesis and Apokolips. Darkseid then tells the group that Metron was trying to discover new information about the Anti-Life Equation when his mind was shattered and he became comatose. The Martian Manhunter probes Metron’s mind to find out what he discovered and learns that the Anti-Life Equation is alive. As Metron tried to escape the Anti-Life Equation's dimension, it attacked him and four "aspects" of the ALE were thrust into the DCU Earth's universe. Metron's Mobius Chair tracked the flight paths of the four aspects and Darkseid tells the heroes that they are currently located on Earth, Rann, Thanagar and Xanshi. If the aspects can destroy any two of those planets, then the Milky Way will collapse on itself. Darkseid then gives the heroes weapons he designed to capture the aspects and divides the group into teams. Orion and Superman will go to Thanagar, Lightray and Starfire to Rann, Batman and Forager to Earth and The Martian Manhunter and Green Lantern to Xanshi. The separate teams all arrive at their respective planets. Immediately upon arrival on Earth Batman makes a phone call to "a friend" requesting this unknown person keep an eye on Darkseid. Back on New Genesis, Mr. Blood asks what his part is in all this. Darkseid and Highfather then reveal an imprisoned Etrigan.

Book Two: Disaster
In Book Two: Disaster, Superman and Orion arrive on Thanagar where they are met with force - the Anti-Life Aspect has seized control of the Thanagarians' minds. As they proceed towards the location of the ALA, they are again attacked. Meanwhile, Green Lantern and the Martian Manhunter arrive on Xanshi to discover that the population is suffering from an airborne communicable virus that's killing them, and meet a scientist who has been trying to discover a cure. Using his Power Ring, John Stewart creates a cure from the scientists’ experiments. Later, John and J'onn discover that the ALA has tapped into the planet's core and controls the very planet itself. As they head to confront the ALA, it creates a hurricane in their path and strikes J'onn with a bolt of lightning, destroying the Anti-Life Catcher weapon built by Darkseid. During this time, John Stewart has become increasingly overconfident and builds a new Anti-Life Catcher with his ring. The two then move on to face the ALA. John places a protective bubble around J'onn and moves him away from the battle, telling him that he can handle it alone. He comes across the ALA and its bomb, only to discover that the bomb is yellow (which the Green Lantern rings are powerless against). The blast knocks GL into space and continues until the entire planet is destroyed. Due to the nature of the Power Ring, both heroes survive the blast. The Martian Manhunter finds Green Lantern on a piece of rock in space and tells him: "Thanks to your arrogance and stupidity, I have now seen two worlds die. I will never forgive you for this". Meanwhile on New Genesis, Darkseid and Highfather reveal to Jason Blood that in order to secure the barrier between our dimension and the ALE's, Blood must once more reunite with The Demon, Etrigan. On Earth, Batman and Forager arrive in the Batcave and discuss their strategy. Batman deduces that the ALA is going to use Earth's computer network to destroy our planet. Alfred makes Forager a new uniform and Batman discovers that the ALA is in Arizona. On Rann, Lightray and Starfire try to find Adam Strange and discover that the population of Rann is trying to kill one another. The two heroes meet up with Strange and the three of them begin the search for the ALA. They arrive at the loading docks and discover the ALA's bomb. They begin the search for the ALA by splitting up. Adam Strange is knocked out and Lightray and Starfire meet back up in an attempt to find the ALA. Back on New Genesis, Jason Blood and Etrigan become one again and Darkseid smiles.

Book Three: Decisions
In Book Three: Decisions, Lightray and Starfire receive word about Xanshi while caring for the injured Adam Strange. Lightray leaves Starfire with Adam to search for the ALA. Starfire then discovers an "oily substance" which attacks her. Lightray, finding nothing in his search, returns to find Starfire unconscious along with Adam Strange. Lightray is attacked by the "oily substance" which turns out to be the ALA. He is knocked out just as Starfire wakes up. Starfire takes both men to safety and confronts the ALA. Lightray wakes up and sees an unconscious Starfire in the grip of the ALA and 14 seconds remaining on the countdown. At three seconds Starfire, who was feigning injury, suddenly flies up and grabs Lightray while the fiery flight emission she produces ignites the ALA, blowing it and the bomb up before it had a chance to arm itself. While outside, the three heroes notice the ALA, in its pure form, flying into space. Meanwhile on Thanagar, Superman and Orion split up to go after the ALA. Orion will proceed ahead and keep the Thanagarians busy while Superman burrows beneath the ground in order to sneak in. Superman finds the bomb, but is attacked by a gigantic robot that the ALA is using as a host. Superman defeats the ALA and returns to the surface expecting to find hundreds of Thanagarians "waking up". Instead, he finds hundreds, possibly thousands dead... at the hands of Orion, who claims that he had to do it on order for Superman to fight the ALA without distraction. Superman hits Orion, knocking him off his Astro-Harness. Orion returns to New Genesis; Superman remains on Thanagar to bury the dead. Back on Earth, Batman and Forager arrive in Moosejaw, Arizona. Forager suspects that the ALA will be using a dead Gotham City police officer as a host, but Batman disagrees. He ran into a Parademon a while back in the Gotham sewers and believes the ALA will be inhabiting its body. Back on New Genesis, Darkseid is losing faith in the heroes’ abilities to conquer the four ALA’s. He tells Highfather that the time is now to attack it head on. While Highfather is contemplating Darkseid's plan, someone appears and has been reading Highfather's mind. He tells Highfather that he knows how to win the battle with the ALE: let Darkseid have his way. Darkseid then reveals a portion of his plan to Etrigan and the Demon reluctantly agrees to help him, thinking he will save the galaxy. John Stewart, the Martian Manhunter and Orion arrive back to New Genesis and are greeted by Highfather. John Stewart walks away, torn up inside by his failure at Xanshi. Highfather tells J’onn to keep an eye on him. Meanwhile, Darkseid has connected a device to himself and Etrigan that will allow Darkseid to manipulate Etrigan's powers. He flips a switch, they become one for an instant and then they are both moved into the ALE’s dimension, where they find the ALE waiting for them. The unknown person who appeared to Highfather reappears as Orion and Highfather find that Darkseid and Etrigan have left to attack the ALE. This unknown man tells them that they can still win, but they must join him in order to do it.

Book Four: Death
In Book Four: Death, Batman and Forager disable the bomb and crush the Parademon under 2 tons of equipment. Joe Bester, the Gotham City Cop, then attacks the two heroes. He is stronger and faster than Batman expected and it's not until Forager cuts his head off that they know why: Joe Bester was a robot.

Suddenly, the ALA/Parademon stands up, stuns Batman by slamming him into the ground and starts choking him to death after breaking his leg. Batman starts to pass out, unable to break the ALA’s grip when suddenly, Forager’s shield hits the ALA in the back, forcing it to drop Batman. After knocking Forager unconscious, the ALA repairs the bomb. Forager wakes up and after briefly attacking the ALA, rushes over to the control station and slams his shield into it, causing an explosion that destroys it before it can arm. Forager dies in the explosion, giving his life to save not only the Earth, but the galaxy as well.

In the meantime, Darkseid and Etrigan discover that the ALE is more powerful than first thought. It appears that they are both about to die when Highfather and Orion appear before them, led by Doctor Fate, who was enlisted by Batman in the first issue by phone call. Dr. Fate saves Darkseid and Etrigan, then combines their collective power in the "Cinque of Cosmic Power" and takes the fight straight to the ALE. There, Dr. Fate reveals that the only way to contain the ALE is by creating a "mystic firebreak". This spell would destroy the dimension they are in, which is a bridge between where the ALE is and the reality that Earth is in. 

A huge explosion occurs and Dr. Fate, Highfather, Orion, Etrigan and Darkseid all return to New Genesis, with the ALE unable to follow them. Darkseid, released from control, is furious with Dr. Fate for "making a puppet out of him" and threatens retaliation, but Superman tells Darkseid he would have to take them all on to do so. Darkseid apologizes and walks away. Meanwhile in another area of New Genesis, John Stewart has used his power ring to pick up a yellow gun, then ordered his ring to travel 20 light years away and come back when he calls it - if he doesn't call it within one hour, he instructs it to find Hal Jordan. The ring flies away and with tears in his eyes, John Stewart puts the gun to his head, while the Martian Manhunter watches from a distance. Finally, he removes the gun from his head. J'onn asks him why he didn’t do it and then begins to chastise him for being a failure and not being worthy of the ring. John looks up at him angrily, drops the gun, calls for his Ring, stands and says, "Screw you J'onzz!" The Martian Manhunter smiles as he watches John Stewart walk away. Later, Superman and Lightray appear carrying a badly beaten Batman and the body of Forager. When Orion insults Forager and refers to him as a "bug", an enraged Batman punches Orion and screams, "His name was Forager!" Orion walks away and as the heroes prepare to return to Earth, they discover that Darkseid is missing as are the weapons that had the imprisoned ALA’s within them. On Apokolips, Darkseid shows Desaad a small piece of pure Anti-Life and on New Genesis, Highfather instructs Orion to escort Forager's body back to the Insect Empire in hopes that it will teach him about tolerance.

Collected editions
The series has been collected into a trade paperback in 1992, and has stayed in print through multiple reprintings:
 Cosmic Odyssey (226 pages, May 2003, DC Comics, Titan Books)

References

External links

1988 comics debuts
Comics by Jim Starlin

Comics by Mike Mignola
Fourth World (comics)